Abasanistus is a genus of flies in the family Stratiomyidae.

Species
Abasanistus aureopictus James, 1973
Abasanistus claviger James, 1973
Abasanistus paulseni (Philippi, 1865)
Abasanistus rubriceps (Philippi, 1865)
Abasanistus rubricornis Kertész, 1923

References

Stratiomyidae
Brachycera genera
Taxa named by Kálmán Kertész
Diptera of South America